The Kansas City Fire Department provides fire protection and emergency medical service for Kansas City, Missouri, and under contract to Village of the Oaks, Village of Oakwood Park, and Village of Oakwood. It provides fire protection only under contract to City of Lake Waukomis, City of Platte Woods, and City of Weatherby Lake. In addition, it provides EMS support under contract for the City of Riverside. It operates 35 fire stations, one dedicated EMS operations facility housing dynamically deployed ambulances, organized into seven battalions and cover .

History 
The Kansas City Fire Department first originated with the formation of volunteer bucket brigades as early as 1858. Church bells rung to signal a fire alarm and members would assemble at the scene to help. In 1867, the city abandoned the voluntary bucket brigade for a paid fire department, and Colonel Frank Foster was elected as its first chief.

The first ladder company was organized in 1869, named McGee Hook and Ladder 1 in honor of former mayor Elijah Milton McGee. By 1872, the department consisted of three steamers, one hook and ladder, one chemical engine, and 36 paid professional firefighters.

In 1877, not long after the city water works had been established, the city leaders thought that there would be sufficient water pressure to fight fires. The fire chief was ordered to remove all of the steamers from service and reduce the force to only 14 men. Shortly thereafter, there was a disastrous fire in the West Bottoms. The KCFD was only able to respond with hose wagons and suffered from low water pressure. As a result, the entire block was threatened and several buildings were destroyed. The steamers were placed back in service the next day.

In 1882, George C. Hale was appointed Chief of the KCFD, a role he held for 31 years. During this time, the KCFD twice represented the United States as the "American Fire Team" at International Fire Congress: London in 1893 and a Paris exposition in 1900. The London competition simulated a night alarm. The men began the race turned out in bed, had to descend a flight of stairs, harness and hitch the horses, and clear the engine house. The best time in Europe was 77.5 seconds, but was handily beaten in 8.5 seconds by the team from Kansas City. The KCFD fire crew won a similar competition at the National Fireman's Tournament in Omaha in 1898. Hale, once known as the world’s most famous fireman, revolutionized fire fighting with his more than 60 patented firefighting inventions, including the Hale water tower, the swinging (horse) harness, the rotary tin roof cutter, and the telephone fire alarm. Chief Hale remains one of the most revered to ever head the KCFD.

By the 1920s, the fire department had grown to 30 stations and 40 companies. In 1928, the first training school opened and the department was fully motorized. 1940 saw a new beginning for the department with 198 new hires, but manpower was depleted with enlistments for World War II. In 1956, a third platoon was installed.

On August 18, 1959, the Kansas City Fire Department was hit with their largest loss of life in the line of duty to that date, when a 25,000 gallon (95,000 liter) gasoline tank exploded during a fire on Southwest Boulevard, killing five firefighters. 

On July 17, 1981, the department responded to the Hyatt Regency walkway collapse, which killed 114 people during a tea dance.

On November 29, 1988, the fire department was struck with another tragedy when an ammonium nitrate explosion killed six fire fighters. The memorial service at Arrowhead Stadium received over 5,000 fire fighters in attendance from the United States and around the world. As a result of this tragedy, a hazardous materials team was created and named HazMat 71 in honor of the companies, Pumpers 30 and 41, that lost men in the explosion.

In 1991, the Firefighters Fountain was dedicated at 31st Street and Broadway in Penn Valley Park to all firefighters who have fallen in the line of duty throughout the city’s history.

On April 25, 2010, Kansas City's ambulance service, Metropolitan Ambulance Services Trust ("MAST") merged into the Kansas City Fire Department.

On October 12, 2015, the fire department experienced more tragedy when a wall collapsed during a fire on Independence Avenue and killed two firefighters. The fire was the result of arson and the owner of one of the businesses destroyed in the fire has been charged with one count of first-degree arson and two counts of second-degree murder or felony murder since the firefighters died as a result of the arson. The Kansas City Royals, who had an amazing come from behind win in game 4 of the American League Division Series against the Houston Astros on the same day the firefighters were killed , showed their support for the firefighting community by wearing KCFD shirts and hats during their workout day at Kauffman Stadium before Game 5 of the ALDS  and honored the fallen firefighters during pregame ceremonies . On May 24, 2016, a 68-page report “Internal Investigation into the Line of Duty Deaths of Fire Apparatus Operator Larry Leggio Firefighter John Mesh” was released .

Stations and apparatus

Notable incidents

Hyatt Regency walkway collapse

The KCFD was the primary agency that responded to the Hyatt Regency walkway collapse which occurred at the Hyatt Regency Kansas City in Kansas City on Friday, July 17, 1981. Two vertically contiguous walkways collapsed onto a tea dance being held in the hotel's lobby. The falling walkways killed 114 and injured a further 216 people. At the time, it was the deadliest structural collapse in U.S. history, not surpassed until the collapse of the south tower of the World Trade Center in 2001.

References

External links 

Government of Kansas City, Missouri
Fire departments in Missouri